Two thumbs down is a catch phrase from Siskel and Ebert's At the Movies (1986 TV program).

It may also refers to:
"Two Thumbs Down", a 2001 demo from Itchy
"Two Thumbs Down", an episode from SpongeBob SquarePants.
"Kitty Flanagan's Two Thumbs Down", a 2012 tour from Kitty Flanagan
"Statler and Waldorf: Two Thumbs Down", a mini-game from Muppets Inside

See also
Two Thumbs Up (disambiguation)
Thumbs Down